Hudson Water Aerodrome  is located on Lost Lake near Hudson, in the Kenora District of Ontario, Canada.

References

Registered aerodromes in Kenora District
Seaplane bases in Ontario